The Carolina Police Department is the main police force for the city of Carolina, Puerto Rico. It was created under law #19 of May 12, 1977, known as Ley de la Policia Municipal (Municipal Police Law) creating the local police forces in each city of Puerto Rico. It was one of the first municipal police forces in Puerto Rico. Between late 1980 and late 2009, the department has become one of the fewest municipal police force in Puerto Rico with the largest number of officers, equipment and budget. Since former mayor Jose Aponte de la Torre took office from 1988 unit his death in 2005, the police force has equipped with equipment, such as patrols equipped with weapons and cage, criminal information system and tactical bulletproof vests for its officers.

Actually, the Department has special units, such as K-9, Maritime Unit, Strategic Operation Section, Domestic Violence Protection Order Section, Transit Unit, Motorcycle Unit, Animal Protection & Environmental Unit, Public Order Code, Communication Section, Athletic League, Giant Reborn Program, Training & Education Institute, Statistics Section, Community Relationship Office.

Municipal police departments of Puerto Rico
1977 establishments in Puerto Rico
Carolina, Puerto Rico